Imuris is the municipal seat of Imuris Municipality in the north of the  Mexican state of Sonora.

Location and Communications
Imuris is located along Federal Highway 15 - the long highway between Nogales at the USA/Mexico border and Mexico City - and the railroad line connecting Nogales and the USA into the Mexican railroad network.  It is also the intersection with the eastbound section of Federal Highway 2, which heads to the state of Chihuahua and the city of Ciudad Juárez (across the Río Grande from El Paso, Texas).

History
The land was once occupied by the Pimas Altos.  In 1687 the Jesuit missionary Eusebio Francisco Kino established the town of "San José de Imuris". The toponym of Imuris is Pima and a possible meaning is "Plateau between rivers" or "hills shaped like flint".

Geography

The region is crossed by three small rivers, which later form the Rio Magdalena.

Economy
Agriculture, cattle raising, and industry are the main economic activities.  

Corn and beans are raised for subsistence while grasses (sorghum, alfalfa, rye grass) are grown for cattle fodder.

The cattle herd numbered 25,617 head in 2000, with this activity employing 638 people.

The industrial sector is varied because there are two maquiladoras owned by international companies, as well as several small factories producing construction materials.  Almost 1000 jobs are generated by the industrial sector making it the most important economic activity of the municipality.  The final products of the maquiladoras are automobile belts, automobile electronic panels, transformers, plastic packaging, and smelting of aluminum.

The main tourist attraction is the Iglesia de San José de Ímuris, as well as the traditional plaza, and the typical restaurants, locally known for fine quesadillas and their world class tacos.

References

External links
 Enciclopedia de los Municipios de Mexico
 INEGI
 Gobierno Municipal de Imuris
 Sonora State official site
 Ímuris, Ayuntamiento Digital (Official Website of Ímuris, Sonora)
 Article on Imuris
 San José de Ímuris

Populated places in Sonora
Populated places in the Sonoran Desert of Mexico